Delmar is the debut album of Argentine stoner rock band, Los Natas, released in 1998 under the now defunct Man's Ruin Records.
This material was first released in 1996, on cassette, an independent edition the band put out containing eight tracks.

Track listing
 "Samurai" - 5:08
 "1980" - 2:39
 "Trilogia" - 5:41
 "I Love You" - 5:31
 "Soma" - 6:47
 "Mux Cortoi" - 2:58
 "Delmar" - 4:01
 "Windblows" - 5:05
 "El Negro" - 5:37
 "Alberto Migré" - 6:12

Personnel 

 Sergio Chotsourian - Guitar, Vocals
 Walter Broide - Drums, Vocal
 Miguel Fernandez - Bass
 Natas and Pichon Dalpont - Producers

Recorded at Pichon Mobile studios

References

1998 albums
Los Natas albums
Man's Ruin Records albums